Castel Frentano is a comune and town in the province of Chieti in the Abruzzo region of Italy.

During World War II, the town was liberated by the New Zealand Army (2nd New Zealand Division) on 2 December 1943.

It is known for bocconotto, a typical dessert.

Main sights
Church of St. Stephen, built in the late 13th and early 14th century, but rebuilt in the 18th century in neo-Classicist style
Church of Santa Maria della Selva
Church of San Rocco
Palazzo Vergilj
Palazzo Crognale
14th century defensive walls

References

External links

Tourist Information

Cities and towns in Abruzzo